Raes Esso Chachar is a village in Ghotki District, Sindh Province, Pakistan.

Villages in Ghotki District